Derby is an unincorporated community in Mountain Township, Saline County, Illinois, United States. Derby is located southeast of Harrisburg.

References

Unincorporated communities in Saline County, Illinois
Unincorporated communities in Illinois